"Shackles (Praise You)" is the debut single by American gospel singer-songwriter duo Mary Mary, released on February 29, 2000, in the United States. It is considered the group's signature song. Stan North of GospelFlava.com deemed it one of the pioneer songs of urban gospel music. The song was originally released as a promotional single for their debut album, Thankful, in 1999. They both feature the same track listing but different album covers, the second using a picture of the duo.

"Shackles" became a top-10 hit in several countries around the world, including Australia, Denmark, Iceland, New Zealand, Norway and the United Kingdom, and it charted well in other major music markets. Mary Mary later shot a music video for the song. A sample of this song was featured on Stormzy's song titled "Rainfall", which was a part of his 2019 album Heavy Is the Head.

Critical reception
Like many contemporary gospel songs, "Shackles" was not without its criticism; many cited the song as being too modern and not staying true to its gospel roots. Mary Mary responded by saying, "It's definitely contemporary. It's music that everybody in any style of music can relate to. It's universal, but the lyrics are undeniably Gospel."

Commercial performance
"Shackles (Praise You)" became a top-40 hit in the United States, peaking at number 28 on the Billboard Hot 100 chart. The song was also a worldwide hit, reaching number five in the United Kingdom and number 17 in Ireland. Across mainland Europe, the song was a top-10 hit Belgium, the Netherlands, and Norway. It also charted strongly in France, Poland, Sweden, and Switzerland, peaking within the top 20. In Australia, the song reached number two in September 2000 and was the highest-selling song of the year that did not reach the number-one spot, coming in at number 10 on Australia's year-end chart for 2000.

Track listings

United States

CD single
 "Shackles (Praise You)" (album version) – 3:18
 "What a Friend" (snippet) – 1:03
 "Be Happy" (snippet) – 1:42
 "Thankful" (snippet) – 1:11
 "Wade in the Water" (snippet) – 1:39

Maxi-CD single
 "Shackles (Praise You)" (single version) – 3:18
 "Shackles (Praise You)" (Maurice's radio mix) – 3:45
 "Shackles (Praise You)" (Maurice's Carnival 2000 mix) – 8:55
 "Shackles (Praise You)" (Maurice's Carnival 2000 mix instrumental) – 8:55
 "Shackles (Praise You)" (Maurice's New Year's Eve dub mix) – 7:15
 "Shackles (Praise You)" (MO-apella) – 2:46

12-inch single
A1. "Shackles (Praise You)" (Maurice's Carnival 2000 mix) – 8:55
A2. "Shackles (Praise You)" (Maurice's New Year's Eve dub mix) – 7:15
B1. "Shackles (Praise You)" (Maurice's Carnival 2000 mix instrumental) – 8:55
B2. "Shackles (Praise You)" (MO-apella) – 2:46
B3. "Shackles (Praise You)" (single version) – 3:18

Cassette single
A1. "Shackles (Praise You)" (album version) – 3:18
B1. "What a Friend" (snippet) – 1:03
B2. "Be Happy" (snippet) – 1:42
B3. "Thankful" (snippet) – 1:11
B4. "Wade in the Water" (snippet) – 1:39
B5. "Shackles (Praise You)" (MO-apella) – 2:46

International

Australian CD single
 "Shackles (Praise You)" (album version) – 3:18
 "Shackles (Praise You)" (Maurice's radio mix) – 3:45
 "Shackles (Praise You)" (Maurice's Carnival 2000 mix) – 8:55
 "Shackles (Praise You)" (Maurice's Carnival 2000 mix instrumental) – 8:55
 "Shackles (Praise You)" (Maurice's New Year's Eve dub mix) – 7:15
 "Shackles (Praise You)" (MO-apella) – 2:46

European CD1
 "Shackles (Praise You)" (album version) – 3:18
 "Shackles (Praise You)" (Maurice's radio mix) – 3:45

European CD2
 "Shackles (Praise You)" (album version) – 3:18
 "Shackles (Praise You)" (Maurice's radio mix) – 3:45
 "I Got It" – 3:52
 "Shackles (Praise You)" (Maurice's Carnival 2000 mix) – 8:55

UK CD1
 "Shackles (Praise You)" – 3:18
 "Shackles (Praise You)" (Hil St. Soul mix) – 3:33
 "Shackles (Praise You)" (2K mix by Tariq) – 3:08
 "Shackles (Praise You)" (The Top Notch remix) – 2:50

UK CD2
 "Shackles (Praise You)" – 3:18
 "Shackles (Praise You)" (Maurice's radio mix) – 3:45
 "Shackles (Praise You)" (Maurice's Carnival 2000 mix) – 8:55

UK cassette single
 "Shackles (Praise You)" – 3:18
 "Shackles (Praise You)" (Maurice's Carnival 2000 mix) – 8:55

Personnel
 Vocals: Mary Mary
 All instruments: Warryn "Baby Dubb" Campbell
 Producer: Warryn Campbell
 Vocal producer: Mary Mary
 Writers: Warryn Campbell, Erica Atkins, Tina Atkins

Charts

Weekly charts

Year-end charts

Certifications

Release history

Mandisa version
In 2007 Mandisa covered "Shackles (Praise You)" on her debut album True Beauty. Mandisa first performed the song during her time on American Idol. Mandisa included a remix version of "Shackles (Praise You)" on her 2014 album "Get Up: The Remixes".

In popular culture
Drag queens Rebecca Glasscock and Shannel lip-synced to the song during the first season of the American reality competition television series RuPaul's Drag Race. It was featured again in season 13 when Olivia Lux and Denali also lip-synced to the song.

References

External links
 Shackles (Praise You) Mary Mary Lyrics
 Shackles (Praise You) Mandisa Lyrics

1999 songs
2000 debut singles
Columbia Records singles
Mandisa songs
Mary Mary songs
Song recordings produced by Warryn Campbell
Songs written by Warryn Campbell